Idanophana is a genus of picture-winged flies in the family Ulidiidae.

Species
 I. gephyra

References

Ulidiidae